Joseph Michel Doyon  (born April 22, 1943) is a Canadian lawyer, historian and author who is the 29th and current lieutenant governor of Quebec. He assumed office on September 24, 2015. Doyon previously served as the 144th head of the Bar of Quebec for the 2007–2008 term.

Biography
Doyon has a Bachelor of Arts from the Laurentian University, a Licentiate in Law, a Master of Arts in History and a Doctorate in History from Laval University. Before practicing law, he taught at the Cégep de Sainte-Foy and lectured at Laurentian University, Laval University and the Bar School of the Barreau du Québec.

Doyon practiced law at Gagné, Letarte for more than 30 years and has extensive experience in business law and commercial arbitration. He has also served as President of the Barreau.

Doyon was appointed King's Counsel and has served as Honorary Colonel of 3 Wing Bagotville. He is a governor of that regiment. He is also an Advocatus Emeritus of the Barreau du Québec and a Knight of Justice and Vice-Prior of the Most Venerable Order of the Hospital of St. John of Jerusalem. He received medals, such as the Commemorative Medal for the 125th Anniversary of Confederation, the Queen Elizabeth II Golden Jubilee Medal, and the Queen Elizabeth II Diamond Jubilee Medal.

On July 21, 2015, he was announced by Prime Minister Stephen Harper as the next Lieutenant Governor of Quebec, replacing outgoing Lieutenant Governor Pierre Duchesne. Doyon recited his oath as the new lieutenant governor on September 24, 2015, in the Legislative Council chamber of the Parliament of Québec, in a ceremony that was boycotted by the opposition Parti Québécois.

On November 15, 2016 he received a Grant of Arms and Supporters, with differences to Jean-François Doyon and Marie-Hélène Doyon.

Honours

Coat of arms

References

External links
Official website

1943 births
Living people
Canadian King's Counsel
Lieutenant Governors of Quebec
People from Quebec City
Université Laval alumni